Pope Gregory V (c. 972 – 18 February  999), born Bruno of Carinthia, was the bishop of Rome and ruler of the Papal States from 3 May 996 to his death. A member of the Salian dynasty, he was made pope by his cousin, Emperor Otto III.

Family
Gregory was a son of Otto I, Duke of Carinthia, a member of the Salian dynasty who was a grandson of Holy Roman Emperor Otto I. Gregory V succeeded John XV as pope when only twenty-four years of age. He was the chaplain of his cousin, Otto III, who presented him as candidate.  Gregory V is often counted as the first German pope (or the second if Boniface II, an Ostrogoth, is counted).

Policies
Politically, Gregory V acted consistently as the Emperor's representative in Rome and granted many exceptional privileges to monasteries within the Holy Roman Empire. One of his first acts was to crown Otto III emperor on 21 May 996. Together, they held a synod a few days after the coronation in which Arnulf, Archbishop of Reims, was ordered to be restored to his See of Reims, and Gerbert of Aurillac, was condemned as an intruder. King Robert II of France, who had been insisting on his right to appoint bishops, was ultimately forced to back down, and also to put aside his wife, Bertha of Burgundy, by the rigorous enforcement of a sentence of excommunication on the kingdom.

Until the conclusion of the council of Pavia in 997, Gregory V had a rival in the person of the antipope John XVI (997–998), whom Crescentius II and the nobles of Rome had chosen against the will of the youthful Emperor Otto III, Gregory's cousin. The revolt of Crescentius II was decisively suppressed by the Emperor, who marched upon Rome. John XVI fled, and Crescentius II shut himself up in the Castel Sant'Angelo. The Emperor's troops pursued the antipope, captured him, cut off his nose and ears, cut out his tongue, blinded him, and publicly degraded him before Otto III and Gregory V. When the much respected St. Nilus of Rossano castigated both the Emperor and Pope for their cruelty, John XVI was sent to the monastery of Fulda in Germany, where he lived until c. 1001. The Castel Sant'Angelo was besieged, and when it was taken in 998, Crescentius II was hanged upon its walls.

Death

Gregory V died suddenly, not without suspicion of foul play, on 18 February 999. He is buried in St. Peter's Basilica near Pope Pelagius I. His successor was Gerbert, who took the name Sylvester II.

References

Sources

External links

 Ein Salier auf dem Stuhl Petri, Online article on Gregory V, from the Diocese of Speyer's publication, Der Pilger
 
 Ein Salier auf dem Stuhl Petri, online article about Gregory V, from the Diocese of Speyer's circular, Der Pilger

Gregory 05
German popes
10th-century German clergy
Salian dynasty
970s births
999 deaths
10th-century popes
Burials at St. Peter's Basilica